The JŽ series 813 is a historic vehicle of Yugoslav Railways. It was nicknamed Zec, meaning "Rabbit", due to good speed for that time.

History
 Service start: 1937
 Last year of service: 1967

External links
 813 at railfaneurope.net

Multiple units of Yugoslavia